The Ollari language (also known as Pottangi Ollar Gadaba, Ollar Gadaba, Ollaro, Hallari, Allar, Hollar Gadbas) is a Central Dravidian language. A closely related variety is Kondekor (also known as Gadaba, San Gadaba, Gadba, Sano, Kondekar, Kondkor, Konḍekor Gadaba, Mudhili Gadaba). The two have been treated either as dialects, or as separate languages. They are spoken in and around Pottangi, Koraput district, Orissa and in Srikakulam District, Andhra Pradesh, India.

Sathupati Prasanna Sree has developed a unique script for use with the language.

Phonology

 There are some nasalized vowels with rare occurrence.

References

Sources 

 

Agglutinative languages
Dravidian languages
Languages of India